The Uzboy (sometimes rendered Uzboj) was a distributary of the Amu Darya which flowed through the northwestern part of the Karakum Desert of Turkmenistan until the 17th century, when it abruptly dried up, eliminating the agricultural population that had thrived along its banks. (It was a part of the ancient region of Dahistan).

A riverine civilization existed along the banks of the river from at least the 5th century BC until the 17th century AD, when the water which had fed the Uzboy abruptly stopped flowing out of the main course of the Amu Darya. The Uzboy dried up, and the tribes which had inhabited the river's banks were abruptly dispersed, the survivors becoming nomadic desert dwellers.

In the early 1950s, construction work started to build a major irrigation canal roughly along the river bed of the former Uzboy. However, the project was abandoned soon after the death of Joseph Stalin in 1953; later on, Qaraqum Canal was constructed along an entirely different, much more southerly, route.

Uzboi Vallis on Mars is named after this river.

Glukhovskoy’s account

Alexandr Ivanovitch Gloukhovsky wrote in 1893 that the Oxus (Amu-Darya) River seemed to flow into the Caspian Sea via the Uzboy River until the 9th century AD and again between 1220 and 1575, approximately.

At various times in the past one or more branches of the Oxus split off from the Oxus delta and flowed west into the fresh-water Sarykamysh Lake. This was drained south by the Uzboy River about 175 km to near Igdi where it turned and flowed about 290 km west, reaching the Caspian at Krasnovodsk Bay through the Bala-Ishem salt marshes. There was a large waterfall, a place called the Lion’s Jaw and at one point the river disappeared underground for some distance. All geographers, from the ancient Greeks to the early Arabs, reported that the Oxus flowed into the Caspian, although their accounts are vague. From the 10th to the 13th centuries there are no reports of a Caspian mouth. It is thought that a dam was built near the old capital of Konya-Urgench and that this dam was destroyed by the Mongols when they sacked the city in 1220. We again hear of a Caspian mouth from about 1310 to 1575. It is possible that the main current shifted from the Aral to the Caspian, causing the Caspian to rise and the Aral to sink. There may have been a significant population along the Uzboy and farmland in what were later the marshes at the north end of the Oxus delta. It seems that about 1575 the east branch of the Oxus cut through some hills causing the main current to shift to the Aral Sea. Also a dam was built near the old site to retain the remaining water and to deny it to the Turkomans who were in the habit of raiding the Oxus delta. This not only blocked the Uzboy but caused the Sarykamysh to slowly dry up.

Peter the Great heard that it would be possible to destroy the dam and send the Oxus into its old channel, thereby making a waterway from Moscow down the Volga and up the Oxus into the heart of Asia. This led to the 1717 invasion, among other things.  Around 1879 Russia sent expeditions to accurately survey the old channel. Glukhovskoy thought that a river diversion would be practical. Either the Sarykamysh could be refilled, which would take about 15 years, or an old river bed could be cleaned out making a canal avoiding the Sary-Kamish depression. The Uzboy would need to be cleared of sand in several places and some dams would be needed. The whole project would cost between 15 and 27 million rubles. (An attempt to realize this was made around 1950-1953.)

See also
 Türkmenbaşy Gulf

Literature 

 Tsvetsinskaya E.A., Vainberg B.I., V. Glushko E.V. "An integrated assessment of landscape evolution, long-term climate variability, and land use in the Amudarya Prisarykamysh delta", Journal of Arid Environments (2002) 51: 363–381 
 Muradov, Ruslan "Mysteries of Dehistan", Turkmenistan (2009):

References

Rivers of Turkmenistan
Former rivers